Robert Raymond, 1st Baron Raymond,  (20 December 167318 March 1733) was a British judge and politician who sat in the House of Commons between 1710 and 1724.

Life
Raymond was the son of the judge Sir Thomas Raymond. He was educated at Eton and Christ's College, Cambridge. Said to have been admitted to Gray's Inn aged nine, he became a barrister in 1697 and was admitted at Lincoln's Inn in 1710. He succeeded his father in 1683 and was knighted on 20 Oct. 1710.

At the 1710 general election, Raymond was returned as Member of Parliament for Bishop's Castle and retained the seat in the 1713 general election.  He was returned as MP for Yarmouth (Isle of Wight) in the 1715 general election but was unseated on petition in 1717. He re-entered parliament at a by-election at Ludlow on 26 March 1719. At the 1722 general election he was returned unopposed at Helston but he resigned the seat in 1724. In 1725 he was invested as Privy Counsellor.

Raymond, a Tory, was appointed as Lord Chief Justice of the King's Bench on 2 March 1725, a post he held until his death. In the trial of Deist Thomas Woolston in 1729 Raymond said:

Christianity in general is Parcel of the Common Law of England, and therefore to be protected by it; now whatever strikes at the Root of Christianity, tends manifestly to a Dissolution of the Civil Government...so that to say, an Attempt to subvert the establish'd Religion is not punishable by those Laws upon which it is establish'd, is an Absurdity.

In 1731 he was raised to the peerage as Lord Raymond, Baron of Abbots Langley in the County of Hertford. In the House of Lords he tried to stop the House of Commons abandoning Law French and replacing it with English. To Raymond, ending the traditional language might lead to other 'modernisations' such as Welsh for courts in Wales. However his opposition failed and in 1733 the courts were anglicised. His tomb in Abbots Langley was sculpted by Peter Scheemakers.

Family

He married Anne, the daughter of Sir Edward Northey of Woodcote Green, Epsom, Surrey, attorney-general and had one son. His monogram and his cipher, a griffin in a crown, can still be seen on the exterior of the building.

Arms

References

1673 births
1733 deaths
Alumni of Christ's College, Cambridge
Members of Gray's Inn
Barons in the Peerage of Great Britain
Peers of Great Britain created by George II
Tory MPs (pre-1834)
Members of the Parliament of Great Britain for constituencies in Cornwall
Members of the Parliament of Great Britain for English constituencies
British MPs 1710–1713
British MPs 1713–1715
British MPs 1715–1722
British MPs 1722–1727
Members of the Privy Council of Great Britain
Lord chief justices of England and Wales
Attorneys General for England and Wales
Solicitors General for England and Wales
Justices of the King's Bench
Knights Bachelor
Members of Lincoln's Inn
People educated at Eton College